John Gregory Bettis (born October 24, 1946) is an American lyricist. He was originally part of the band Spectrum, which also featured Richard and Karen Carpenter. He wrote the lyrics for "Top of the World", a hit for both Lynn Anderson and The Carpenters. He wrote several more hits for The Carpenters, including "Only Yesterday", "Goodbye to Love" and "Yesterday Once More". He later wrote hits for other artists including Madonna ("Crazy for You"), Michael Jackson ("Human Nature"), The Pointer Sisters ("Slow Hand"), Diana Ross ("When You Tell Me That You Love Me"), Jennifer Warnes ("Nights Are Forever"), Peabo Bryson ("Can You Stop the Rain"), George Strait ("Heartland"), Ronnie Milsap ("Only One Love in My Life"), and Barbara Mandrell ("One of a Kind Pair of Fools"). 38 Special ("Like No Other Night") 
New Kids on the Block ("If You Go Away")
Barbra Streisand ("Sweet Forgiveness") Whitney Houston ("One Moment in Time")

He has been nominated four times and won two Emmy Awards for his work in television. His first Emmy was for the theme to the 1988 Summer Olympics co-written with Albert Hammond, and his second win was for "Where There is Hope" from Guiding Light.
Bettis has written the themes for many long-running TV series. With Steve Dorff, he wrote the theme to Growing Pains, Just the Ten of Us and My Sister Sam. 
With George Tipton, he wrote the themes to Empty Nest and Nurses. 

He was nominated for a Golden Globe and an Oscar for Promise Me You'll Remember from The Godfather Part III. 
His work in film also includes: Star Trek V: The Final Frontier, Body Rock,  The Last Boy Scout, Twilight Zone: The Movie, The Lonely Guy, Legend, Vision Quest, Supergirl, The Men's Club, Pure Country, Nothing in Common, Cocktail, 8 Seconds, Cobra, Back to the Beach, December Boys, Curly_Sue and Say Anything. 

In theatre, Bettis has provided lyrics for the musicals Lunch (tour 1994); Svengali (1992); The Last Session (L.A. Drama critics Award, Best Musical Score 1998); Say Goodnight (1999); Pure Country (2008) and most recently Josephine (2011).
 
Bettis has nearly 800 song credits in the ASCAP database. In 2011, Bettis was inducted into both the Songwriters Hall of Fame as well as the Nashville Songwriters Hall of Fame.

Early life 
John Bettis was born in Long Beach, California, the son of Wayne Douglas and Nellie Jane (House) Bettis. While he grew up in Southern California, his family's roots are in Missouri's Ozark Mountains. Bettis was introduced to country music at a very early age. Bettis began singing and playing trumpet when he was eight. In high school, he took up the guitar, was a member of the choir, and was active in theater. He attended San Pedro High School and graduated in 1964, At age 16, he auditioned and landed the lead role in a high-school production of Carousel where he first discovered the craft of songwriting. Shortly after, Bettis and his understudy formed a folk duo and began performing and touring on the folk circuit, opening for acts like Hoyt Axton, Ian & Sylvia and The Dillards. After graduation, he attended Long Beach State College. At CSULB, Bettis was writing songs for his college choir (conducted by Frank Pooler) when he met fellow student Richard Carpenter and his sister Karen. The three of them formed a band called Spectrum in 1966. In order to make money for equipment, Bettis and Richard Carpenter formed a duo with Bettis on banjo and Carpenter on piano and regularly performed a golden oldies set at Disneyland.

Songwriting career 
In 1969, Richard and Karen Carpenter signed a contract with A&M Records. Their debut album Offering had 11 songs co-written by Bettis but was not a commercial success. At the request of label owner Herb Alpert, the team recorded "Close to You", a Bacharach/David composition, in 1970 which became the Carpenters first hit, with the Bettis/Carpenter-penned "Goodbye to Love" and "Yesterday Once More" finding equal success in 1972 and 1973.

During this time Bettis was spending half the year in Nashville slowly getting acquainted with the songwriting community. After hearing the Carpenter/Bettis song "Top of the World", country star Lynn Anderson recorded the song, earning Bettis his first success in country music. Anderson was the first to release the song as a single and make it a hit in 1973. The success of Anderson's recording prompted the Carpenters to release their version as a single that same year. The Carpenters' version peaked at #1 for two weeks on the Billboard Hot 100 chart in December 1973.

While the Carpenters rose to fame with co-written hits like "Only Yesterday", "I Need to Be in Love" and their own version of "Top of the World", Bettis continued working in Nashville. In 1978, Ronnie Milsap had a number one hit with Bettis' co-written "Only One Love in My Life".

In 1981, The Pointer Sisters peaked at number two for three weeks on the Billboard Hot 100 as well as number 7 on the R&B chart with "Slow Hand", written by John Bettis and Michael Clark, with Conway Twitty making it a number one hit on the Billboard Hot Country Singles chart the following year. Clark and Bettis also co-wrote Juice Newton's "Heart of the Night" and Donna Summer's "The Woman in Me".

In 1983, Bettis gained his biggest achievement with "Human Nature", a ballad penned for Michael Jackson's multi-platinum album Thriller. Originally a throwaway lyric and melody snippet composed by Toto's Steve Porcaro, the entire song was later written in its entirety by Bettis and Porcaro in two days. Thriller became the best selling record of all time, and "Human Nature" has since been recorded by Boyz II Men, Miles Davis, John Mayer, George Howard, Christine Collister, and David Benoit. It has also been sampled by SWV, Ne-Yo, 2Pac, Lil Wayne, Nas, Jason Nevins and Chris Brown. In the same year, Barbara Mandrell's "One of a Kind Pair of Fools" reached number one on the country chart.

In 1985, Bettis accepted an assignment in Hollywood to write a song for the soundtrack of the film Vision Quest. The end result was "Crazy for You", a song not originally written for, but recorded by Madonna, who also performs it in the movie. The song was an international hit, and led to the film being re-titled Crazy for You when it was released in the UK and Australia.

Perhaps Bettis' best-known commissioned work is "As Long as We Got Each Other", co-written with long-time collaborator Steve Dorff as the theme song to the hit ABC Network television sitcom Growing Pains, sung by five-time Grammy winner B. J. Thomas for six seasons, solo for season 1; and, as a duet with Jennifer Warnes for seasons 2, 3, 5, and 7; and with Dusty Springfield for season 4.

In 1988, he co-wrote "One Moment in Time" with Albert Hammond which was recorded by Whitney Houston as the theme for the Summer Olympics.

John Bettis continued developing an eclectic catalog into the 1990s. 1991's "Can You Stop the Rain" topped the R&B charts in 1991 for Peabo Bryson. "If You Go Away" was a top 20 hit in 1992 for New Kids on the Block, and "Heartland", from the soundtrack to the film Pure Country, was a number one hit for George Strait.

Theater 
Bettis has provided lyrics for the musicals Lunch (tour 1994); Svengali (1992); The Last Session (L.A. Drama critics Award, Best Musical Score 1998); Say Goodnight (1999); Pure Country (2008), and most recently Josephine (2011).

Awards 
Bettis was nominated for an Academy Award and Golden Globe Award for Best Original Song for "Promise Me You'll Remember" from The Godfather Part III. Other nominations include: Grammy Award nominations for Best R&B Song ("Can You Stop the Rain") and Best Song, Film and TV ("One Moment in Time", theme for the 1988 Olympics). Bettis received two Emmy Awards: "Where There Is Hope" and "One Moment in Time" and received Emmy nominations for Best Music and Lyrics ("Swept Away" and "As Long as We Got Each Other"). He was nominated for Nashville Songwriters Association Song of the Year and Music City Song of the Year.

In 2011, Bettis was inducted into both the Songwriters Hall of Fame as well as the Nashville Songwriters Hall of Fame.

Personal life 
John Bettis currently lives in Nashville with his wife Mary and his children.

Songs 
 List of songs by John Bettis

References

External links
 Biography
 Official EMI Biography
 

1946 births
20th-century American composers
21st-century American composers
American banjoists
American country songwriters
American male songwriters
American musical theatre lyricists
American television composers
California State University, Long Beach alumni
Living people
Musicians from Long Beach, California
20th-century American male musicians
21st-century American male musicians